Velosauria is a group of pareiasaur reptiles that existed in the late Permian period. They ranged in size from the 50-centimeter-long Pumiliopareia to the 3-meter-long Scutosaurus. Velosaurs were some of the largest reptiles of their time.

Description

Velosaurs were large reptiles that were characterized by their short tails, small heads, broad feet, and their legs, which were directly in between sprawling and semi-erect. Velosaurs' bodies were covered in osteoderms and smaller scales all over. Their heads came in all sorts of different shapes; from the cheek-frilled Scutosaurus to the spiky-headed Elginia to the nose-horned Arganaceras. They were herbivorous, and it is believed that their large bodies housed a complex gut.

Classification

Some paleontologists believe velosaurs to be the direct ancestors to turtles. They argue that the smaller pumiliopareiasaurs evolved large, plate-like scutes that laid flat on their backs and eventually evolved into shells. This is highly disputed, though. Most scientists currently believe turtles to be more closely related to sauropterygians.

Below is a cladogram by Tsuji et al. (2013):

Paleobiology

Velosaurs were definitely herbivorous. They are generally thought to be slow-moving terrestrial animals, although some believe that they are semi-aquatic.

References

 Lee, M.S.Y. (1997). "Pareiasaur phylogeny and the origin of turtles". Zoological Journal of the Linnean Society. 120 (3): 197–280. doi:10.1111/j.1096-3642.1997.tb01279.x.
 Schoch, Rainer R.; Sues, Hans-Dieter (24 June 2015). "A Middle Triassic stem-turtle and the evolution of the turtle body plan". Nature. 523: 584–587. doi:10.1038/nature14472. . (Subscription required (help)).
 Tsuji, L. A.; Sidor, C. A.; Steyer, J. - S. B.; Smith, R. M. H.; Tabor, N. J.; Ide, O. (2013). "The vertebrate fauna of the Upper Permian of Niger—VII. Cranial anatomy and relationships of Bunostegos akokanensis (Pareiasauria)". Journal of Vertebrate Paleontology. 33 (4): 747–763. doi:10.1080/02724634.2013.739537.
 Kriloff, A.; Germain, D.; Canoville, A.; Vincent, P.; Sache, M.; Laurin, M. (2008). "Evolution of bone microanatomy of the tetrapod tibia and its use in palaeobiological inference". Journal of Evolutionary Biology. 21 (3): 807–826. doi:10.1111/j.1420-9101.2008.01512.x. .

Pareiasaurs